Danylo Yaroslavovych Sikan (born 16 April 2001) is a Ukrainian professional footballer who plays as a forward for Shakhtar Donetsk.

Club career
Sikan started playing football in FC Polissya Zhytomyr as a child. Then becoming teenager, he came to the academy FC Karpaty Lviv.

He made his debut for FC Karpaty Lviv in the Ukrainian Premier League in a match against FC Zorya Luhansk on 12 August 2018, but then played in competitions for reserves. Later that season (2018–19) Sikan was loaned out to FC Mariupol.

Just before turning 18, he came to FC Shakhtar Donetsk in 2019. For Shakhtar Sikan debuted with home victory against his former club Karpaty on 4 August 2019. That season he played 7 matches for the senior side and made a debut at continental club competitions on 26 November 2019 in an away tie against Manchester City. Struggling to get on a scoreboard, Sikan was placed back in competitions among reserves.

For 2020–21 Sikan was loaned again to Mariupol for the whole season where he made his debut in the Ukrainian Cup competitions. His Premier League goals count also started after return to the team from the near Sea of Azov city.

On 31 January 2022, he joined Hansa Rostock in the 2. Bundesliga on loan until the end of the season.

On 25 October 2022, in a UEFA Champions League group stage match against Celtic, Sikan missed an open goal after a pass across the penalty box from Mykhailo Mudryk to put the Ukrainian side ahead with the score level at 1-1. It is considered to be one of the worst misses of all time in football.

International career 
Sikan was a part of the Ukraine national U-20 football team, that won the 2019 FIFA U-20 World Cup.

Sikan scored his first goal for Ukraine on 1 September 2021 against Kazakhstan, the day of his debut for the team, coming on as an 82nd minute substitute. The match ended in a 2–2 draw.

Career statistics

Club

International 

Scores and results list Ukraine's goal tally first, score column indicates score after each Sikan goal.

Honours
Shakhtar Donetsk
Ukrainian Premier League: 2019–20
Ukrainian Super Cup: 2021

Ukraine U20
FIFA U-20 World Cup: 2019

Individual
 FIFA U-20 World Cup Silver Boot: 2019

References

External links
 
 

Living people
2001 births
Footballers from Zhytomyr
Ukrainian footballers
Association football forwards
Ukraine international footballers
Ukraine youth international footballers
Ukraine under-21 international footballers
FC Shakhtar Donetsk players
FC Mariupol players
FC Karpaty Lviv players
FC Hansa Rostock players
Ukrainian Premier League players
2. Bundesliga players
Ukrainian expatriate footballers
Expatriate footballers in Germany
Ukrainian expatriate sportspeople in Germany
Sportspeople from Zhytomyr Oblast